Paulo Roberto "Paulão" Moreira da Costa (born April 29, 1969, in Salvador) is a retired male beach volleyball player from Brazil. He won the bronze medal at the 1997 World Championships in Los Angeles, California, partnering Paulo Emilio Silva.

References

External links
 
 

1969 births
Living people
Brazilian men's beach volleyball players
Sportspeople from Salvador, Bahia
20th-century Brazilian people